The Regional Studies Association is a learned society with an international network of academics, policy makers and practitioner members. It was founded in 1965, following the foundation of the Regional Science Association in the USA and International Centre for Regional Planning and Development in the UK.  Regional studies (sometimes called area studies in the USA) is a field of interdisciplinary research focusing on the sub-national, such as city and regional development, urbanisation, economic inequalities and migration issues. The research not only crosses the boundaries of countries, but also the disciplines of geography, economics, sociology and planning. The Association is registered with the UK Charity Commission (Charity No. 1084165) and Companies House (Company No. 04116288). The Association organises international events and various micro-grant awards.

The Association has collaborated with the Smith Institute to produce several reports, including 'Britain for sale? Perspectives on the costs and benefits of foreign ownership' (2016), 'Where next for Local Enterprise Partnerships?' (2013) and 'Changing Gear – Is Localism the New Regionalism?' (2012).  In 2018, Towards Cohesion Policy 4.0: Structural Transformation and Inclusive Growth was published by the RSA.

The Regional Studies Association are members of various bodies, including Memnet, the Academy of Social Sciences (Learned Societies) and the Foundation Science and Technology.

Publications 
There are five scholarly journals from the Association, published by the Routledge Taylor & Francis Group.

Regional Studies publishes interdisciplinary research crossing the boundaries of economic, environmental, political and social aspects of regional development and policy-making.

Spatial Economic Analysis focuses on spatial economics and is published with the British and Irish Section of the Regional Science Association International.

Territory Politics Governance focuses on research and theory relating to territory, politics, economics and the governance of space.

Area Development and Policy publishes research from the Global South and Greater BRICS.

Regional Studies, Regional Science is an interdisciplinary open-access journal with a mentored Early Career section.

References 

 Ackermann, E.A. (1955). First International Conference on Regional Planning and Development: Report of the Proceedings of the Conference Held at Bedford College, London, 28th September to 2nd October 1955. Provisional Committee for the International Centre for Regional Planning and Development, 1955.
 Barnes, T. (2004). "The rise (and decline) of American regional science: lessons for the new economic geography?" Journal of Economic Geography 4: 107-129. 
 Charity Commission: Regional Studies Association.
 Companies House: THE REGIONAL STUDIES ASSOCIATION Company number 04116288 https://beta.companieshouse.gov.uk/company/04116288.
 Crouch, C., Findeisen, F., Allen, J., Mills, J., Tomaney, J., Pryke, M., Raco, M., Morre-Cherry, N., Hunter, P., O'Brien, P. Britain for sale? 2016, Perspectives on the costs and benefits of foreign ownership. London: The Smith Institute Britain-for-sale.pdf.
 Eddowes, D. (Ed.) 1998 Learned & Professional Societies Accredited & Affiliated to the Foundation for Science & Technology, Technological Innovation and Society 14:2, pp23.
 Hopkins, J. (2015). Knowledge, networks and policy: regional studies in postwar Britain and beyond. Abingdon: Routledge. 
 Isard, W. (2003). History of regional science and the Regional Science Association International: The beginnings and early history. Springer Verlag.
 Ward, M. and Hardy, S.(Eds.) 2013. Where next for Local Enterprise Partnerships? London: The Smith Institute Where-next-for-local-enterprise-partnerships.pdf.
 Ward, M. and Hardy, S.(Eds.) 2012. Changing Gear – is localism the new regionalism? London: The Smith Institute Changing-gear.pdf.
 Wise, M. (1989). The Origins of the Regional Studies Association. In Garside, P. & Hebbert, M. (Eds.) British Regionalism 1900 -2000. London: Mansell Publishing Ltd.

External links
 Regional Studies Association 
 Regional Studies 
 Spatial Economic Analysis
 Territory Politics Governance
 Area Development and Policy
 Regional Studies, Regional Science

Organizations established in 1965
Learned societies of the United Kingdom